Grandidier's Madagascar swift (Oplurus grandidieri) is a species of saxicolous (rock dwelling) lizard in the family Opluridae. The species is endemic to Madagascar.

Etymology
The specific name grandidieri, is in honor of French naturalist Alfred Grandidier.

Description
Grandidier's Madagascar swift has a distinctive light mid-dorsal band.

Geographic range
On the island of Madagascar O. grandidieri has been found in a number of localities in the southern central highlands.

Reproduction
O. grandidieri is oviparous.

References

Further reading
Glaw F, Vences M (1994). A Fieldguide to the Amphibians and Reptiles of Madagascar, Second Edition. Cologne, Germany: Vences & Glaw Verlag / Serpents Tale. 480 pp. .
Mocquard F (1900). "Nouvelle contribution à la faune herpétologique de Madagascar ". Bulletin de la Société Philomathique de Paris, Neuvième Série [Series 9] 2: 93–111. (Hoplurus grandidieri, new species, pp. 105–106). (in French).
Savage JM (1952). "The Correct Generic Names for the Iguanid Lizards of Madagascar and the Fiji Islands". Copeia 1952 (3): 182. (Oplurus grandidieri, new combination).

Oplurus
Reptiles of Madagascar
Endemic fauna of Madagascar
Reptiles described in 1900
Taxa named by François Mocquard